The Piaggio P.XII is an Italian 18-cylinder radial aircraft engine developed in the 1930s by Rinaldo Piaggio S.p.A. The P.XII was two Piaggio P.X engines in tandem, which were versions of the French Gnome-Rhône 9K Mistral made under license, themselves being much modified Gnome-Rhône 9A - a license-built Bristol Jupiter.

The engine was used in some Italian aircraft from 1940 until the end of World War II, especially the Piaggio P.108. An up-rated version was tested as the Piaggio P.XXII.

Variants
Variants of the Piaggio P.XII include:
(R - Riduttore - reduction gearing and C - Compressore - supercharged)
P.XII R.C.35 (geared, rated altitude )
P.XII R.C.40 (geared, rated altitude )
P.XII R.C.l00/2v (geared, rated altitude )
P.XV R.C.60/2v (geared, rated altitude )
P.XXII R.C.35DHigher rating with slightly higher displacement than the P.XII series engines. (geared, rated altitude )
P.XXII R.C.35RSame as P.XXII R.C.35D, but propeller rotates in opposite direction
P.XXII R.C.60 (geared, rated altitude )

Applications 
CANT Z.1015
CANT Z.1018
CANT Z.511
Caproni Ca.169
Piaggio P.108
Savoia-Marchetti SM.84ter
Savoia-Marchetti SM.89

Specifications (P.XII R.C.35)

See also

References

Notes

Bibliography 
 Gunston, Bill. World Encyclopedia of Aero Engines. Cambridge, England. Patrick Stephens Limited, 1989. 
 Wilkinson, Paul H.. Aircraft Engines of the World. 1941

Aircraft air-cooled radial piston engines
1930s aircraft piston engines
P.XII